Dong Thap University (DThU) is a Vietnamese public university based in the city of Cao Lanh in Dong Thap Province. It is one of the educational and research institutions in the Mekong Delta region of Vietnam.

History
The school was established in 1989 as a normal school under the moniker Dong Thap Pedagogical College. On January 10, 2003, officials released a decree that upgraded the school's official status from vocational college to a university. On September 4, 2008, officials expanded the school's scope and approved a change in name to Dong Thap University.  In 2017, the university's degree programs received full accreditation and certification by the Vietnam National University system. In the 2016–2017 academic year, it became the first university in the Mekong Delta certified to meet the quality standards by the Ministry of Education and Training.

Description
The current rector of the university is Ho Van Thong.
The school offers 32 undergraduate major and 6 graduate degrees.  In 2016, the rectors claimed that 92% of the school's lecturers held postgraduate qualifications.

Admissions
In 2019, the university announced it would refund the tuition of graduates from their Math, Chemistry, and Primary School Pedagogy departments if they are not able to secure a job after graduating with a degree from the university.  The rector's announcement was made as an effort to both showcase the high rates of employment among their alumni and the efforts the university was making to create a job pipeline

In 2021, Dong Thap began interviewing applicants to assess them on criteria beyond test scores, as an effort to identify high performing students that may not meet Vietnamese score-focused educational conventions.

Student body
The university has approximately 8,000 students enrolled. Students organize a number of activities and clubs, such as a campus-wide book club and a championship futsal team. The school also has employs a human resources unit solely focused on ensuring graduating students have jobs after graduation.

Research
The university publishes its own "Dong Thap University Journal of Science".

Faculties
 Faculty of Foreign Languages
 Faculty of Vietnamese Literature and Linguistics Teacher Education
 Faculty of Mathematics -Informatics Teacher Education
 Faculty of Art Teacher Education
 Faculty of Natural Sciences Teacher Education
 Faculty of Social Sciences Teacher Education
 Faculty of Primary and Pre-School Education
 Faculty of Physical Education - National Security and Defense Education
 Faculty of Economics
 Faculty of Culture Tourism and Social Work
 Faculty of Agriculture and Environment Resources

Offices
 Administrative Affairs Office
 Office of Planning and Finance
 Students Affairs Office
 Office of Inspections and Legal Affairs
 Academic Affairs Office
 Graduate Studies Office
 International Affairs Office
 Quality Assurance Office
 Office of Facilities and Project Management
 Personnel Affairs Office
 Research Affairs Office
 Office of Information and Communications
 Office of Communist Party and Unions Affairs

Centres
 Center for Training Partnership and Professional Development
 Foreign Languages and Informatics Center
 IT and Lab Center
 Le Vu Hung Resources Center
 Services Center
 Hoa Hong Pedagogical Practice Kindergarten

References

External links
Dong Thap University official site

Đồng Tháp province
Universities in Vietnam
Buildings and structures in Đồng Tháp province